The Lot (stylised as the lot) is a compilation box set by Queen drummer Roger Taylor, containing nearly all of his solo work outside of Queen, including material released both under his own name and with his band the Cross. The box set's release was originally scheduled for 11 October 2013, but was pushed back a month; both The Lot and Taylor's fifth solo album Fun on Earth were released on 11 November 2013. 

Initial pressings featured numerous technical issues, which Taylor and his manufacturing team attempted to address by asking buyers to return affected copies in exchange for corrected copies. The album was re-released on 10 November 2014.

Background 

Apart from his work with Queen, Taylor recorded five solo albums, and three with the Cross. He released his first single, "(I Wanna) Testify", in 1977. He went on to record two solo albums, Fun in Space (1981) and Strange Frontier (1984). They were modestly successful when released. 

In 1986, two years after the release of Strange Frontier, Taylor formed the Cross, recruiting Spike Edney, Clayton Moss, Peter Noone, and Josh Macrae. The Cross went on to record three albums: Shove It; Mad, Bad and Dangerous to Know; and Blue Rock. The band split up in 1993. 

After the breakup of the Cross, Taylor released his third solo album, Happiness?. It engendered some controversy, due to the inclusion of the track "Nazis 1994". The furore likely increased sales, however. In 1998, Taylor released his fourth album, Electric Fire. He would not record another album until Fun on Earth, which was released on 11 November 2013, simultaneously with the release of The Lot.

All of Taylor's solo albums and the three albums by the Cross, as well as numerous standalone singles and alternate mixes, are included in The Lot. Discs One through Eight consist of the Taylor and Cross albums, in chronological order, while discs Nine through Twelve include alternative single edits, remixes, non-album singles, B-sides and a handful of previously unreleased rarities. Disc Thirteen is a DVD containing Taylor and the Cross' promotional music videos, along with a number of never-before-seen Taylor live performances.

Upon release, it became apparent there were several technical problems with the first pressing of the box set. These included errors in the printed lyrics, the inclusion of incorrect mixes of certain songs, and several other audio issues. Consumers who had bought the initial release were asked to return their copies to Universal Records, which would replace them with corrected copies. 

Taylor assessed The Lot as a good retrospective of his career: "It's very satisfying to get it all in one place. I didn't realise how much there was: eight CDs, videos, lots of singles. I’d forgotten a lot. But it's very satisfying".

Track listing 
All tracks written by Roger Taylor, except where noted.

Personnel 
The following personnel worked on the album:
 Roger Taylor: art conception, cover design, design, drums, executive producer, guitar, guitar feedback, instrumentation, keyboards, mixing, percussion, piano, primary artist, producer, soloist, stylophone, lead and backing vocals
 Spike Edney: composer, keyboards, mandolin, piano, backing vocals
 Clayton Moss: composer, guitar, lead and backing vocals
 Peter Noone: bass, composer, backing vocals
 Josh Macrae: drums, percussion, backing vocals, engineer, mixing, producer, programming

Additional musicians 

 Keith Airey: guitar
 Gary Barnacle: saxophone (on "Cowboys and Indians", "Contact", and "Stand Up For Love")
 Steve Barnacle: bass
 Jeff Beck: guitar (on "Say It's Not True")
 Phil Chen: bass
 Jim Cregan: guitar
 Mike Crossley: keyboards, piano
 John Deacon: bass (on some tracks)
 Matthew Exelby: guitar
 Jason Falloon: bass, guitar
 Steve Hamilton: saxophone
 Kevin Jefferies: bass
 Helen Liebmann: cello
 Dick Marx: arranger, strings
 Brian May: rhythm guitar and lead guitar (on some tracks)
 Freddie Mercury: lead vocals (on "Heaven for Everyone"), backing vocals (on "Killing Time" and "Feel the Force")
 Treana Morris: lead vocals (on "Surrender")
 Jonathan Perkins: keyboards, organ, lead and backing vocals
 Catherine Porter: backing vocals
 Keith Prior: drums
 David Richards: keyboards
 Geoffrey Richardson: viola, violin
 Nicola Robins: violin
 Phil Spalding: bass
 Steve Stroud: bass
 Rufus Taylor: drums, piano
 Candy Yates: backing vocals
 Claire Yates: backing vocals
 Yoshiki: arranger, drums, piano, synthesizer (on "Foreign Sand")

Technical personnel 

 Rich Breen: engineer, mixing
 John Brough: engineer
 Brad Buxer: programming
 Dean S. Crathern: assistant
 Justine Ellis: project coordinator
 Mike Ging: engineer
 Geoff Grace: programming
 Martin Groves: band coordinator
 Hiro Inoguchi: artists and repertoire
 Chris Lawson: assistant engineer
 Mack: engineer, producer
 Kevin Metcalfe: cut, mastering
 Tal Miller: assistant engineer
 David Richards: engineer, producer
 Justin Shirley-Smith: producer
 Wills Spencer: coordination, video editor
 Mike Stock: assistant engineer
 Simon Van Zwanenberg: assistant engineer
 Mark Wallis: engineer, producer
 Barry Woodward: mastering
 Yoshiki: producer (on "Foreign Sand")

Artistic personnel 

 Stephen Bliss: artwork, design
 Greg Brooks: archival consultant, sleeve notes
 Simon Fowler: photography
 Bob Geldof: photography
 Richard Gray: art conception, artwork, cover design, design, photography
 George Hurrell: photography
 Mike Jackson: cover photo
 Thea Kurun: artwork
 Tim Mara: paintings
 Jim Marks: photography
 Simon Pool: design assistant
 Sarina Potgieter: photography
 Neal Preston: cover photo
 Paul Rider: photography
 Sheila Rock: photography
 Gary Taylor: archival consultant, sleeve notes
 George Taylor: photography
 Graham Temple: photo montage
 Rhys Thomas: foreword, liner notes
 Gary Wathen: design
 Ian Wright: illustrations

References 

2013 compilation albums
Roger Taylor (Queen drummer) albums
Universal Records compilation albums